The Turn-of-River Bridge, also known as Old North Stamford Road Bridge, is a single-span lenticular pony truss bridge built by the Berlin Iron Bridge Company in 1892. It was listed on the National Register of Historic Places in 1987. It formerly brought the Old Stamford Road across the Rippowam River, but is now open only to pedestrian traffic, as the road ends shortly before the bridge.

The bridge uses the design patented by William O. Douglas in 1878 for a lens-type truss bridge, and is built out of wrought and cast iron, with pin connections, and has a concrete deck. It is one of only about twenty lenticular truss bridges remaining in the state. It is now open only to pedestrian traffic.

See also
List of bridges documented by the Historic American Engineering Record in Connecticut
List of bridges on the National Register of Historic Places in Connecticut
National Register of Historic Places listings in Stamford, Connecticut

References

External links

Road bridges on the National Register of Historic Places in Connecticut
Bridges completed in 1892
Buildings and structures in Stamford, Connecticut
Historic American Engineering Record in Connecticut
Truss bridges in the United States
Bridges in Fairfield County, Connecticut
National Register of Historic Places in Fairfield County, Connecticut